"All the Time in the World" is a song by Dr. Hook from the album [[Pleasure and Pain (Dr. Hook album)|Pleasure & Pain]]''. Produced by Ron Haffkine, it was released as a single in late 1978 and charted on both the U.S. and Canadian singles charts, including the Country and Adult Contemporary charts of both countries.

Chart performance

References

1978 songs
1978 singles
Dr. Hook & the Medicine Show songs
Song recordings produced by Ron Haffkine
Capitol Records singles
Songs written by Even Stevens (songwriter)
Songs written by Shel Silverstein